Qian Zhang from the Hong Kong University of Science and Technology was named Fellow of the Institute of Electrical and Electronics Engineers (IEEE) in 2012 for contributions to the mobility and spectrum management of wireless networks and mobile communications.

References

Fellow Members of the IEEE
Living people
Year of birth missing (living people)
Place of birth missing (living people)
Academic staff of the Hong Kong University of Science and Technology